Guraleus brazieri is a species of sea snail, a marine gastropod mollusk in the family Mangeliidae.

Description
The length of the shell varies between 10 mm and 15 mm.

Distribution
This marine species is endemic to Australia and can be found off New South Wales, Victoria, Western Australia and Tasmania.

References

 Angas, G.F. 1871. Descriptions of thirty-four new species of shells from Australia. Proceedings of the Zoological Society of London 1871: 13–20
 Tenison-Woods, J.E. 1876. Description of new Tasmanian shells. Papers and Proceedings of the Royal Society of Tasmania 1875: 131–159
 Hedley, C. 1903. Scientific results of the trawling expedition of H.M.C.S. "Thetis" off the coast of New South Wales in February and March, 1898. Mollusca. Part II. Scaphopoda and Gastropoda. Memoirs of the Australian Museum 4(6): 325–402, pls 36–37
  Hedley, C. 1922. A revision of the Australian Turridae. Records of the Australian Museum 13(6): 213–359, pls 42–56 
 Allan, J.K. 1950. Australian Shells: with related animals living in the sea, in freshwater and on the land. Melbourne : Georgian House xix, 470 pp., 45 pls, 112 text figs.
 Laseron, C. 1954. Revision of the New South Wales Turridae (Mollusca). Australian Zoological Handbook. Sydney : Royal Zoological Society of New South Wales 1–56, pls 1–12.

External links
  Tucker, J.K. 2004 Catalog of recent and fossil turrids (Mollusca: Gastropoda). Zootaxa 682:1–1295.

brazieri
Gastropods described in 1871
Gastropods of Australia